William Martin Gelbart (September 11, 1945 - August 11, 2015) was an American geneticist and a professor of molecular and cellular biology at Harvard University. He was best known for his work with fly genetics, the discovery of decapentaplegic (dpp), and the formation of Flybase. He was a member of the National Advisory Council for the Human Genome Project.

Early life and education
Gelbart was born in Brooklyn and earned his B.S. in biology from Brooklyn College in 1966 and a PhD in genetics from the University of Wisconsin in 1971 with Allen S. Fox.

Career and research
Gelbart did his postdoctoral work with Edward B. Lewis at Caltech and Art Chovnick at the University of Connecticut. He began his career at Harvard University in 1976 before becoming a full professor in 1983. His research was focused on molecular basis of pattern formation using the fruit fly as a model system. Using transvection, his group identified decapentaplegic, an locus containing an ortholog of human bone morphogenetic proteins.  Gelbart was a major leader in consolidating the findings of the Drosophila community into Flybase along with Michael Ashburner, Rachel Drysdale, Gerry Rubin, Thom Kaufman and Kathy Matthews.

References

Harvard University faculty
Brooklyn College alumni
University of Wisconsin alumni
American geneticists
1945 births
2015 deaths